The Division of Fisher is an Australian Electoral Division in Queensland.

Geography
Since 1984, federal electoral division boundaries in Australia have been determined at redistributions by a redistribution committee appointed by the Australian Electoral Commission. Redistributions occur for the boundaries of divisions in a particular state, and they occur every seven years, or sooner if a state's representation entitlement changes or when divisions of a state are malapportioned.

History

The division was created in 1949 and is named after Andrew Fisher, Prime Minister of Australia on three non-consecutive occasions within the first two decades following Federation. It is located in the Sunshine Coast area north of Brisbane and includes the towns of Caloundra, Mooloolaba, Beerwah, Maleny, Woodford and Kilcoy.

As originally created, it extended as far inland as Kingaroy, but gradually moved eastward from the 1960s onward to become an entirely Sunshine Coast-based seat. It was a safe seat for the National Party until the 1980s.  However, some of its more conservative territory was shifted to the new seat of Fairfax in 1984, replaced by some more marginal territory in the outer northern suburbs of Brisbane.  On these boundaries, Labor took the seat in 1987.

The Brisbane portion was removed in 1993 (mostly going to the new seat of Dickson), erasing Labor's majority and making Fisher notionally Liberal.  The Liberals took the seat in 1993, and have held it for all but two years since then without much difficulty.  To date, it is the last time Labor has held a Sunshine Coast seat.

Its most prominent members have been Sir Charles Adermann, who was Deputy Leader of the Country Party 1964–66, and Peter Slipper, who served as Speaker of the Australian House of Representatives from 2011 to 2012. Following the resignation of Harry Jenkins as Speaker in the 43rd Parliament, Peter Slipper was nominated unopposed and installed as Speaker on 24 November 2011. Slipper resigned from the Liberal National Party on taking the Speaker's seat and continued in parliament as an independent member and resigned as speaker and went to the cross bench on 9 October 2012. On 11 May 2013, he joined businessman Clive Palmer's recently formed Palmer United Party, becoming its first member in federal parliament. However, a matter of hours later his membership of the party was revoked and Slipper returned to being an independent.

Members

Election results

References

External links
 Division of Fisher (Qld) — Australian Electoral Commission

Electoral divisions of Australia
Constituencies established in 1949
1949 establishments in Australia
Federal politics in Queensland
Sunshine Coast, Queensland